Thomas Kent Wetherell (December 22, 1945 – December 16, 2018) was an American politician and educator. He served as member of the Florida House of Representatives from 1980 to 1992, and was president of Florida State University from 2003 through 2009.

Early life
Wetherell was born in Daytona Beach, Florida, to a well known Pioneer family of the Daytona Beach area. His father Thomas James Wetherell, was born in Holly Hill on Feb. 16, 1912. and his mother Mildred Juanita Kent Wetherell. His paternal great grandparents Thomas Wetherell ( 1845- 1921) and Margaret Wetherell who traveled to this country by schooner from Durham, England. arrived in the Daytona Beach area, in 1876 from Philadelphia on a boat that was heading for Miami.  It stopped here instead when it ran into a tropical storm. The family had traveled to this country by schooner from Durham, England. It was his grandfather Thomas Wetherell (1867–1945) who was involved in many of the firsts in the area including helping build the Ponce de Leon Lighthouse.  Wetherell attended Port Orange Elementary School and Mainland High School. He attended Florida State University (FSU) on a football scholarship and played from 1963 to 1967. While at FSU, Wetherell joined the Phi Delta Theta fraternity. He earned two academic degrees in social studies and education, in 1967 and 1968. In 1974, he received a doctorate in education administration from FSU.

Political career 
Wetherell, a Democrat, was a member of the Florida House of Representatives from 1980 to 1992, and Speaker of the House in 1991 and 1992. He served as chair of the house's Appropriations and Education committees.

Educational career
Wetherell served as president of Tallahassee Community College (TCC) from 1995 to 2001; before that, he was president of the Independent Colleges and Universities of Florida. During his time as president of TCC, the school saw increased enrollment and a campus expansion. Wetherell also worked at Daytona Beach Community College and Florida Technological University. After he resigned from his post at TCC, Wetherell was a lobbyist for the Southern Strategy Group. The FSU Board of Trustees appointed Wetherell to be president on December 18, 2002. His salary was ranked among the top ten for public university presidents in the United States. Later, Lee Hinkle, joined Wetherell's administration as a Vice President for University Relations. In late 2006, he added his voice to efforts by Bernie Machen, president of the University of Florida to bring a play-off to Division I-A college football.

Personal life
After a divorce from his first wife, with whom he had a son, Wetherell married Virginia Bass Wetherell, a former Florida state government official and state legislator; he gained two stepdaughters from this marriage. Until early 2018, he maintained the 983-acre Oak Hill Plantation in Jefferson County, Florida near Tallahassee. He was a fan of hunting birds including turkey, dove and quail on the estate. At one point he had pledged the lodge and grounds to Florida State University upon his death but since 2012 or 2013 he changed his will to leave it to his family.

Wetherell had been suffering from prostate cancer since 2002. Wetherell died from complications of cancer on December 16, 2018, six days before his 73rd birthday.

References

External links
FSU: Office of the President

1945 births
2018 deaths
American football wide receivers
American lobbyists
Deaths from cancer in Florida
Florida State Seminoles football players
Florida State University alumni
Mainland High School alumni
Players of American football from Florida
Presidents of Florida State University
Speakers of the Florida House of Representatives
Democratic Party members of the Florida House of Representatives
Sportspeople from Daytona Beach, Florida